The Third Chamber of Deputies of the Ottoman Empire was elected in the 1908 Ottoman general election, which was called following the Young Turk Revolution.  The new parliament consisted of 147 Turks, 60 Arabs, 27 Albanians, 26 Greeks (Rum), 14 Armenians, 10 Slavs, and four Jews. Including the amount of deputies elected in by-elections, the total amount of seats included 288 deputies. On 17 January 1912, through an imperial decree, the Sultan Mehmed V dissolved the Chamber of Deputies and called for new elections within three months.

Members

Notes

References

Sources 
 
 Meşrutiyet ve Cumhuriyet mebusları - Hakan Yılmaz (Boğaziçi Üniversitesi)
 https://www.tbmm.gov.tr/tutanaklar/TUTANAK/MECMEB/mmbd01ic01c001/mmbd01ic01c001ink001.pdf
 
 

Politics of the Ottoman Empire
Ottoman Empire-related lists